The Uman uezd was one of the subdivisions of the Kiev Governorate of the Russian Empire. It was situated in the southern part of the governorate. Its administrative centre was Uman.

Demographics
At the time of the Russian Empire Census of 1897, Umansky Uyezd had a population of 320,744. Of these, 85.4% spoke Ukrainian, 11.7% Yiddish, 1.8% Russian, 0.9% Polish and 0.1% German as their native language.

References

 
Uezds of Kiev Governorate
1797 establishments in the Russian Empire
1923 disestablishments in Ukraine